Where It All Began is the 16th studio album by musician Bo Diddley released by the Chess label in 1972.

Reception

Allmusic awarded the album 3 stars with reviewer Bruce Eder stating "Johnny Otis and Pete Welding produced this surprisingly successful soul effort by Bo, which succeeded in reshaping his sound ... Unfortunately, none of this mattered to the people who still cared about Bo Diddley -- they wanted the beat and the old sound ... He gave them his classics in concert, but not on this album. And it all came so late in the day: not only in terms of Bo's identification as anything but an oldies act , but as part of the history of Chess Records (now subsumed into the GRT corporate operation, the Chess imprint having no meaning or significance), that Where It All Began vanished from sight, leaving scarcely a trace or a ripple on the charts.".

Track listing 
All compositions by Ellas McDaniel except where noted
 "I've Had It Hard" – 3:13
 "Woman" (Ellas McDaniel, Kay McDaniel) – 3:06
 "Look at Grandma" (Cornelia Redmond, Kay McDaniel) – 3:31
 "A Good Thing" (Oliver Sain) – 2:37
 "Bad Trip" (Redmond, Kay McDaniel) – 6:00
 "Hey, Jerome" (Cornelia Redmond, Ellas McDaniel) – 3:08
 "Infatuation" (Ellas McDaniel, Kay McDaniel) – 3:43
 "Take It All Off" (Eva Darby) – 3:20
 "Bo Diddley-Itis" – 5:40

Personnel 
Bo Diddley – vocals, guitar
Dave Archuletta – organ
Tom Thompson, Shuggie Otis (track 8) – guitar
Richard Davis, Terry Gottlieb (tracks 4 & 7) – bass
Ed O'Donnell, Johnny Otis (track 1) – drums 
Gloria Scott  –  background vocals
Vera Hamilton – background vocals
Connie Redmond – background vocals, lead vocal on "A Good Thing"
Harriette Reynolds – background vocals

References 

1972 albums
Chess Records albums
Bo Diddley albums